Acacia hammondii, also known as Hammond's wattle, is a tree or shrub belonging to the genus Acacia and the subgenus Juliflorae that is native across northern Australia.

Description
It has smooth or fibrous and fissured bark. The angular and resinous branchlets can be glabrous or slightly haired and have with prominent lenticels. Like most species of Acacia it has phyllodes rather than true leaves. The phyllodes have a linear or narrowly elliptic shape and are flat and straight or slightly curved. It blooms from May to July producing yellow flowers.

Distribution
In is endemic across tropical parts of northern Australia in Western Australia, the Northern Territory and Queensland. It is found as far west as the Kimberley region of Western Australia. It is quite common in coastal and subcoastal areas around the lower part of the Gulf of Carpentaria including the offshore islands. It is far less common in western inland parts of the Northern Territory and eastern parts of Queensland. It grows well in sand, sandy loam, clay and stony lateritic soils as a part of open Eucalyptus woodland communities scattered through the grassy understorey.

See also
 List of Acacia species

References

hammondii
Acacias of Western Australia
Plants described in 1917
Taxa named by Joseph Maiden